Circus World (1981) is a science fiction collection by American writer Barry B. Longyear, about a planet descended entirely from the population of a crashed spaceship carrying a circus.

Contents
The collection comprises the following short stories:

 "The Tryouts" (1978)
 "The Magician's Apprentice" (1979)
 "The Second Law" (1979)
 "Proud Rider" (1979)
 "Dueling Clowns" (1979)
 "The Quest" (1979)
 "Priest of the Baraboo" (1979)

1981 short story collections
Science fiction short story collections
Berkley Books books

References